Ponte Testaccio is a bridge that links Largo Giovanni Battista Marzi to Lungotevere Portuense in Rome (Italy), in the Rione Testaccio and in the Quarter Portuense.

Description 
The bridge, designed by architect Bastianelli and whose construction began in 1938, was intended to link the lengthening of Viale Aventino to Roma Trastevere railway station through the demolition of the former slaughterhouse; its name should have been Ponte d'Africa. 
It was inaugurated in 1948.

Notes

Bibliography 

Bridges in Rome
Stone bridges in Italy
Bridges completed in 1948
Rome R. XX Testaccio
Rome Q. XI Portuense